Triathlon has been included in the Summer Youth Olympics since their inauguration. Unlike the Summer Olympic competition, a mixed relay is competed, in which competitors are paired across national boundaries to create evenly matched multinational teams, as part of the Youth Olympic Games' spirit of cooperation.

Medalists

Boys' individual

Girls' individual

Mixed relay

Medal table
As of the 2018 Summer Youth Olympics.

See also
Triathlon at the Summer Olympics

References

 International Olympic Committee results database

External links
Youth Olympic Games

Youth Olympic Games
Triathlon